Savident is a surname. Notable people with the surname include:

John Savident (born 1938), British actor
Lee Savident (born 1976), Guernsey cricketer